Taston is a hamlet in Spelsbury civil parish, about  north of Charlbury and  southeast of Chipping Norton, Oxfordshire.

History
Its toponym is derived from Thorstan meaning "Thorstone", a small standing stone claimed to be a thunderbolt of the god Thunor. At the centre of Taston are the base and broken shaft of a Medieval preaching cross. It is a Grade II* listed building. Middle Farmhouse is a house built of coursed rubble in the 17th and early 18th centuries. Part of the roof is of Stonesfield slate. The farmstead has a four-bay barn that was built of stone early in the 18th century and altered in 1884. The Firkins is a small house near Thorsbrook Spring. It is built of rubble and probably dates from early in the 18th century. It was built in 1862 in memory of Henrietta, Viscountess Dillon, wife of Henry Dillon, 13th Viscount Dillon.

References

External links

Hamlets in Oxfordshire
West Oxfordshire District